The COMMD3-BMI1 gene in humans encodes the COMMD3-BMI1 readthrough protein.

Function

This locus represents naturally occurring read-through transcription between the neighboring COMM domain-containing protein 3 and polycomb complex protein BMI-1 genes on chromosome 10. The read-through transcript produces a fusion protein that shares sequence identity with each individual gene product.

References

Further reading 

Genes
Human proteins